Jackson High School is a public high school in Jackson, Georgia, United States.  It has been an accredited school since 1947.  It has 962 students as of the 2017–18 school year, educated by 58 certificated teachers. The school's athletic teams are known as the Red Devils with school colors of red and navy blue. Academic programs offered include Advanced Placement courses in biology, chemistry, English, US history, world history, music theory, and studio art. Courses in construction and business, and NJROTC are also available.

References

Public high schools in Georgia (U.S. state)
Schools in Butts County, Georgia